John Clarke Davison (19 April 1875 – 19 February 1946) was a barrister and Unionist politician in Northern Ireland.

Davison was educated at Coleraine Academical Institution and Trinity College, Dublin and was called to the Irish Bar in 1898. He was a legal adviser to the Government of Northern Ireland from 1922–1925, and Senior Crown Prosecutor for County Louth and County Antrim. In 1925, he was elected in a by-election as a Unionist to the Parliament of Northern Ireland from County Armagh, and then from 1929 from Mid-Armagh until resigning his seat shortly after the 1938 general election upon appointment as Recorder of Londonderry.

He was Chairman of Ways and Means and Deputy Speaker of the House of Commons from March – June 1937 and Parliamentary Secretary to the Ministry of Home Affairs from 1937 – 1938. He died on 19 February 1946.

Notes

1875 births
1946 deaths
Alumni of Trinity College Dublin
Barristers from Northern Ireland
Members of the House of Commons of Northern Ireland 1925–1929
Members of the House of Commons of Northern Ireland 1929–1933
Members of the House of Commons of Northern Ireland 1933–1938
Members of the House of Commons of Northern Ireland 1938–1945
Northern Ireland junior government ministers (Parliament of Northern Ireland)
Ulster Unionist Party members of the House of Commons of Northern Ireland
Judges in Northern Ireland
People educated at Coleraine Academical Institution
Members of the House of Commons of Northern Ireland for County Armagh constituencies